Eduru Leni Alexander is a 2014 Telugu action-romance feature film starring Taraka Ratna and Komal Jha in the lead roles. The film is directed by PLK Reddy

Plot 
Taraka Ratna plays the role of a sincere police officer battling the villains Jinnah Bhai (Ravi babu) and Kottappa (Jayaprkash Reddy) and dealing with land grabbing and prostitution in the city. Officer Alexander is a law unto himself having killed at least 99 people at last count when the police commissioner transfers him from Vizag to Hyderabad.

Komal Jha plays the role of the love interest of the police officer, who is impressed by his heroics and pursues him.

Cast 
 Taraka Ratna as Alexander
 Komal Jha as Komal
 Ravi Babu as Jinnah
 Jayaprakash Reddy as Kotappa

Reception 
The film is rated 1.5 stars out of 5 by The Times of India movies review. The review comments state - "All through the movie, you have Alexander mouthing dialogues to make him look and sound bigger than he is".  The AP Herald review states - "Komal Jha is the heroine of this film who comes and goes out of the film at her will. She looked good in the songs, the director should have given more scope to her role".

Technical Review - Both technically and musically the film is appallingly low on quality and the director has also failed in generating any interest through his narration in the film.

It was stated by the critics that Taraka Ratna has to choose better scripts if he is keen on come back to mainstream roles in Telugu industry.

Soundtrack 
The music is composed by Dr. Josyabatla Sarma and is rated as average in reviews.
 "Alexander" sung by Geetha Madhuri, Vedala Hemachandra
 "Guleba Kavali" sung by Vedala Hemachandra, Malavika
 "Vayasu" sung by M. M. Keeravani, Amruta Varshini
 "Kavvinchina" sung by Chaitra Ambadipudi and Prasobh
 "Vayasu (version 2)" sung by Usha

References 

2014 films
2010s Telugu-language films